is an indoor ice hockey arena in Nagano, Japan with a capacity of 10,104 seated spectators. Its official name is the Nagano Wakasato Tamokuteki Sports Arena. The arena was completed and officially opened on December 10, 1995.

Location

Big Hat is the most central of the venues of the 1998 Winter Olympics that were constructed in the city of Nagano, approximately 2 km south of Nagano Station. White Ring, the venue for the figure skating and short track speed skating is a further 3.5 km south. Nagano Olympic Stadium, where the opening and closing ceremonies were held, is 8 km south of Big Hat. M-Wave, where the long-track speed skating events took place, is 5 km to the east. Finally, Aqua Wing Arena, which was the ice hockey B arena, is 5.3 km to the north of Big Hat.

Events
The ice hockey games from the 1998 Winter Olympics, including the men's and women's finals, were held at this arena. The rink still serves as the location of the Nagano Cup, an annual ice hockey tournament held to commemorate the 1998 games, as well as many short track speed skating competitions. The Wakasato hall in the complex features a stage and theater seating, and frequently serves as a venue for music recitals and public meetings.

Specifications
Building area: 12,050 m2
Total floor area: 25,240 m2
Structure: Reinforced concrete, 4 floors above ground, 1 basement below
Capacity: 5,000

See also 
 List of indoor arenas in Japan

References

External links

1998 Winter Olympics official report. Volume 2. pp. 219-22.
Big Hat
 Shinano Mainichi Shimbun Guide 
Big Hat Information (Japanese)

Basketball venues in Japan
Buildings and structures completed in 1995
Indoor arenas in Japan
Indoor ice hockey venues in Japan
Venues of the 1998 Winter Olympics
Olympic ice hockey venues
Shinshu Brave Warriors
Sports venues completed in 1995
Sports venues in Nagano Prefecture
1995 establishments in Japan
Sport in Nagano (city)